Shallow trench isolation (STI), also known as box isolation technique, is an integrated circuit feature which prevents electric current leakage between adjacent semiconductor device components. STI is generally used on CMOS process technology nodes of 250 nanometers and smaller. Older CMOS technologies and non-MOS technologies commonly use isolation based on LOCOS.

STI is created early during the semiconductor device fabrication process, before transistors are formed. The key steps of the STI process involve etching a pattern of trenches in the silicon, depositing one or more dielectric materials (such as silicon dioxide) to fill the trenches, and removing the excess dielectric using a technique such as chemical-mechanical planarization.

Certain semiconductor fabrication technologies also include deep trench isolation, a related feature often found in analog integrated circuits.

The effect of the trench edge has given rise to what has recently been termed the "reverse narrow channel effect" or "inverse narrow width effect". Basically, due to the electric field enhancement at the edge, it is easier to form a conducting channel (by inversion) at a lower voltage. The threshold voltage is effectively reduced for a narrower transistor width. The main concern for electronic devices is the resulting subthreshold leakage current, which is substantially larger after the threshold voltage reduction.

Process flow
Stack deposition (oxide + protective nitride)
Lithography print
Dry etch (Reactive-ion etching)
Trench fill with oxide
Chemical-mechanical polishing of the oxide
Removal of the protective nitride
Adjusting the oxide height to Si

See also
 FEOL

References

External links
Clarycon: Shallow trench isolation
N and K Technologies: Shallow trench isolation
Dow Corning: Spin on Dielectrics - Spin-on Shallow Trench Isolation

Semiconductor device fabrication
Semiconductor structures